William Coyle (24 October 1926 – May 2011) was an English amateur footballer who played as a centre half in the Football League for Darlington. He previously played non-league football for West Auckland Town.

References

1926 births
2011 deaths
Footballers from Newcastle upon Tyne
English footballers
Association football defenders
West Auckland Town F.C. players
Darlington F.C. players
English Football League players